"Het is een nacht... (Levensecht)" (English: "It is a Night... (Lifelike)") is the debut single by Dutch artist Guus Meeuwis. The song was produced by Ad Kraamer and written by Meeuwis. It was released in 1995 as the lead single from Meeuwis's debut studio album Verbazing.

Meeuwis wrote the song after a romantic weekend with his girlfriend Valérie Gregoire in Bruges. In 1994, Meeuwis and a couple of friends entered a talent competition (the AHC-Studentensongfestival) in Leiden with this song and won. As a result, the group was offered a recording contract by Willem van Schijndel, under the name "Guus Meeuwis & Vagant".

The song became a huge hit in The Netherlands and Belgium and reached the peak position in both the Dutch and Belgian charts. It spent seven weeks at number one in the Dutch Top 40 and eight weeks at number one in the Mega Single Top 100 and the Ultratop 50. More than 250,000 copies were sold.

Charts

Weekly charts

Year-end charts

Decade-end charts

The Baseballs cover

"Het is een nacht... (Levensecht)" was covered by the rockabilly cover band, The Baseballs, in 2011, under the name "This is a Night (Het is een nacht)", featuring vocals by Meeuwis. The lyrics were partially translated into English. The single is included on the Dutch version of The Baseballs' album Strings 'n' Stripes, as well on a special edition of Meeuwis's album Armen open. The song reached the 69th position in the Mega Single Top 100.

Charts

See also
List of Dutch Top 40 number-one singles of 1995
List of Ultratop 50 number-one singles of 1995

References

1995 singles
2011 singles
Dutch pop songs
Dutch-language songs
Songs about nights
Dutch Top 40 number-one singles
1994 songs